Navacerrada Dam is a reservoir at Navacerrada in the Community of Madrid, Spain.

External links

Sociedad Española de Presas y Embalses  profile

Reservoirs in the Community of Madrid
Dams in Spain